KMSG-LD (channel 53) is a low-power television station in Fresno, California, United States, affiliated with MyNetworkTV. It is owned by Cocola Broadcasting alongside Merced-licensed Estrella TV affiliate KGMC (channel 43) and seven other low-power stations. KMSG-LD's transmitter is located on Bear Mountain, near Meadow Lakes, California.

KMSG's Azteca America feed was rebroadcast on KVVG-LD channel 54.1 in Visalia.

History
KVVG-LD started out as KVVG-LP, an affiliate of Almavision for the Visalia area in early 2005. Formerly on channel 31, it later moved to channel 54. KVVG-LP changed to Tvida Vision in mid-2005. As of 2011, the station converted to a digital signal, as KVVG-LD.

The KVVG calls were originally used on a DuMont affiliate on channel 27 in Tulare in the 1950s. The KMSG calls were originally used on what is now CW affiliate KFRE-TV (channel 59) from its sign-on from 1985 to 2001.

Until mid-2006, KMSG's programming was also seen on KPMC-LP (channel 42, now KZKC-LD) in Bakersfield, which was sold to McGraw-Hill, becoming a standalone Azteca América affiliate and later a translator of ABC affiliate KERO-TV (channel 23).

On September 28, 2020, MyNetworkTV programming moved to KMSG, after the network's previous affiliate, KAIL (channel 7), switched to TCT.

On December 31 2022 Azteca America ceased operation.

Programming
KMSG provides programming for the Hispanic community. Some of its most popular programming includes novelas, sports events such as First Division Mexican League Soccer, news, talk, comedy, reality, and women's magazines.

Newscasts

When KMSG took on the MyNetworkTV affiliation, the station aired an edition of KFSN-TV's Action News at 8:00 p.m. weeknights, which previously aired on KAIL. The newscast ended in December 2021 and the station aired NewsNet for three months following.  

KMSG offers 2½ hours of news per week (30 minutes each weekday) with the San Joaquin Valley's only 8 p.m. newscast, My 53 News at 8:00, hosted by news director Austin Reed, which debuted April 1, 2022. The half-hour newscast immediately repeats. KMSG also airs the weekly syndicated program The Reed Report produced by Reed, which also airs on KWVT-LD.

Subchannels
The station's digital signal is multiplexed:

Rebroadcasters

Former

References

External links
Cocola Broadcasting
KMSG MyTV53

MyNetworkTV affiliates
Charge! (TV network) affiliates
Decades (TV network) affiliates
Daystar (TV network) affiliates
MSG-LD
MSG-LD
Low-power television stations in the United States